Chaplinesque, My Life and Hard Times, a.k.a. The Eternal Tramp (video title), is a 1972 documentary film directed by Harry Hurwitz.

Plot

Gloria Swanson narrates this documentary about the early life of Charlie Chaplin.

References

External links 

1972 films
Charlie Chaplin
Documentary films about film directors and producers
Documentary films about actors
1972 documentary films
Black-and-white documentary films
American documentary films
Films directed by Harry Hurwitz
American black-and-white films
1970s English-language films
1970s American films